The 2009 Women's EuroHockey Nations Championship was the 9th edition of the women's field hockey championship organised by the European Hockey Federation. It was held from August 22 to August 29, 2009 in Amsterdam, Netherlands.

Results
All times are Central European Summer Time (UTC+2)

Preliminary round

Pool A

Pool B

Classification round

Fifth to eighth place classification
The third and fourth place team in each pool competed in a pool to determine the fifth to eighth-place winners. The last two placers will be relegated to EuroHockey Nations Trophy in 2011. Note that the match played against each other in pool A or B counts in the pool C classification.

Pool C

First to fourth place classification

Semi-finals

Third and fourth place

Final

Statistics

Final standings

Goalscorers

See also
 2009 Men's EuroHockey Nations Championship
 2009 Women's EuroHockey Nations Trophy

References

2009
2009 in women's field hockey
2009 in Dutch women's sport
2009 Women's EuroHockey Nations Championship
Sports competitions in Amsterdam
2000s in Amsterdam
August 2009 sports events in Europe
Women 1
EuroHockey Championship